The  is Germany's unemployment payment introduced on 1 January 2023. The  was developed by Olaf Scholz's coalition government and agreed by Germany's two chambers in November 2022. Compared to its predecessor  (commonly known as Hartz IV), it has a higher unemployment grant. Adult jobseekers living alone now received a default sum of €502 per month, compared to previously €449. The introduction of  also increased the amount of personal wealth that beneficiaries can hold without being deducted part of their unemployment grant. A single adult can own up to €40,000.  also replaced the Sozialgeld, a benefit for people who cannot work.

Predecessor 

The  predecessor Hartz IV was introduced on 1 January 2005 by the Second Schröder cabinet, a coalition of the German Social Democrats and Greens. How much money beneficiaries received was adjusted several times since. In 2011, the grand coalition between Social Democrats and Christian Democrats reformed Hartz IV.

Reform 
Beginning in 2022, labour minister Hubertus Heil (Social Democrats) developed the  proposal for the ruling traffic light coalition. After the coalition passed their proposal in Germany's lower chamber (Bundestag), the opposition Christian Democrats (CDU) vetoed it in the upper chamber (Bundesrat). This led to negotiations and a Bundesrat-Bundestag compromise reached via the  procedure.

References 

Unemployment in Germany
Welfare in Germany
Scholz cabinet